The Arado Ar 67 was the single-seat biplane fighter successor to the Ar 65.

The Ar 67 appeared in 1933 and was developed alongside the Ar 68. The Ar 67 was considerably smaller and lighter than the Ar 65. But the Ar 68 proved to be a better performer, and all further work on the Ar 67 was discontinued after only one prototype was built.

Specifications (Ar 67a)

See also

References

Further reading 
 Green, William, and Gordon Swanborough, The Complete Book of Fighters (Salamander Books, 2002)

Biplanes
Single-engined tractor aircraft
Arado Ar 067
Ar 067